Earl of Ellesmere, of Ellesmere in the County of Shropshire, is a title in the Peerage of the United Kingdom. It was created in 1846 for the Conservative politician Lord Francis Egerton. He was granted the subsidiary title of Viscount Brackley, of Brackley in the County of Northampton, at the same time, also in the Peerage of the United Kingdom. Born Lord Francis Leveson-Gower, he was the third son of George Leveson-Gower, 1st Duke of Sutherland and Elizabeth Gordon, 19th Countess of Sutherland. In 1803 his father had inherited the substantial estates of his maternal uncle Francis Egerton, 3rd Duke of Bridgewater. On his father's death in 1833, Lord Francis succeeded to the Egerton estates according to the will of the late Duke of Bridgewater, and assumed by Royal licence the surname of Egerton in lieu of Leveson-Gower. The Brackley and Ellesmere titles created for him in 1846 were revivals of titles held by the Dukes of Bridgewater. In 1963 his great-great-grandson, the fifth Earl, succeeded his kinsman as 6th Duke of Sutherland. The earldom of Ellesmere and viscountcy of Brackley are now subsidiary titles of the dukedom.

The Hon. Alfred Egerton, younger son of the second Earl, represented Eccles in Parliament.

The family seat was Worsley New Hall.

Earls of Ellesmere (1846)
Francis Egerton, 1st Earl of Ellesmere (1800–1857)
George Granville Francis Egerton, 2nd Earl of Ellesmere (1823–1862)
Francis Charles Granville Egerton, 3rd Earl of Ellesmere (1847–1914)
John Francis Granville Scrope Egerton, 4th Earl of Ellesmere (1872–1944)
John Sutherland Egerton, 5th Earl of Ellesmere (1915–2000) (succeeded as Duke of Sutherland in 1963)
For further Earls of Ellesmere, see the Duke of Sutherland

See also
Duke of Sutherland
Duke of Bridgewater
Countess of Sutherland
Earl Granville

References

Earldoms in the Peerage of the United Kingdom
Noble titles created in 1846
Noble titles created for UK MPs

Ellesmere